The 68th Writers Guild of America Awards honored the best in film, television, radio and video-game writing of 2015. Winners were announced on February 13, 2016 at Hyatt Regency Century Plaza, Los Angeles, California. The nominations for Television, New Media, Radio, News and Promotional Writing were announced on December 3, 2015, while, Theatrical and Documentary Screenplay were announced on January 6, 2016, and Video-game Writing was announced the following week. There were no nominees in the Television Graphic Art and Animation.

The show was hosted by Lisa Kudrow.

Nominees

Film

Television

Documentary

News

Radio

Promotional Writing

Videogaming Writing

References

External links 
 Official Site

2015
2015 film awards
2015 in American cinema
2015 in American television
2015 television awards
2015 guild awards
2015 awards in the United States
February 2016 events in the United States